Édouard Saint-Poulof (4 April 1877 – 8 October 1934) was a French equestrian. He competed in two events at the 1920 Summer Olympics.

References

1877 births
1934 deaths
French male equestrians
Olympic equestrians of France
Equestrians at the 1920 Summer Olympics
People from Rambouillet